The International Convention on Civil Liability for Bunker Oil Pollution Damage (BUNKER) is an International treaty listed and administered by the International Maritime Organization, signed in London on  and in force generally on .  The purpose is to adopt uniform international rules and procedures for determining questions of liability and providing adequate compensation.

In the convention, Bunker Oil is fuel used to power the ship. The convention covers leakage of that oil, and requires signatories to the convention to have their ships appropriately insured against such leakages.

It is associated with and references:
 United Nations Convention on the Law of the Sea
 International Convention on Civil Liability for Oil Pollution Damage (CLC [Convention])
 International Convention on Liability and Compensation for Damage in Connection with the Carriage of Hazardous and Noxious Substances by Sea (HNS Convention)
 International Convention for the Prevention of Pollution from Ships (MARPOL)

While BUNKER is apparently similar to CLC Convention – they are substantially different. Unlike the CLC, the BUNKER Convention is not limited to persistent fuel oils and will apply to any hydrocarbon used to operate the ship.

State parties
While the convention has been widely adopted, notable exceptions include Bolivia and Honduras — which are generally flag of convenience states—have not ratified the treaty. As with the CLC, the United States of America was a driver behind the BUNKER convention, and had legislation in place similar to BUNKER provisions, the Oil Pollution Act of 1990, hence it claimed, the treaty did not need to be signed.

As of November 2018, the treaty has been ratified by 90 states.

References

External links
 IMO Brochure on Civil Liability for Bunker Oil Pollution Damage

Treaties of Albania
Treaties of Antigua and Barbuda
Treaties of Australia
Treaties of Austria
Treaties of Azerbaijan
Treaties of the Bahamas
Treaties of Bahrain
Treaties of Barbados
Treaties of Belgium
Treaties of Belize
Treaties of Brazil
Treaties of Bulgaria
Treaties of Canada
Treaties of China
Treaties of the Comoros
Treaties of the Republic of the Congo
Treaties of the Cook Islands
Treaties of Croatia
Treaties of Cyprus
Treaties of the Czech Republic
Treaties of Ivory Coast
Treaties of Denmark
Treaties of Djibouti
Treaties of Egypt
Treaties of Estonia
Treaties of Ethiopia
Treaties of Fiji
Treaties of Finland
Treaties of France
Treaties of Georgia (country)
Treaties of Germany
Treaties of Greece
Treaties of Grenada
Treaties of Hungary
Treaties of Indonesia
Treaties of Iran
Treaties of Ireland
Treaties of Italy
Treaties of Jamaica
Treaties of Jordan
Treaties of Kenya
Treaties of Kiribati
Treaties of North Korea
Treaties of South Korea
Treaties of Latvia
Treaties of Liberia
Treaties of Lithuania
Treaties of Luxembourg
Treaties of Madagascar
Treaties of Malaysia
Treaties of Malta
Treaties of the Marshall Islands
Treaties of Mauritius
Treaties of Mongolia
Treaties of Montenegro
Treaties of Morocco
Treaties of Myanmar
Treaties of the Netherlands
Treaties of New Zealand
Treaties of Nicaragua
Treaties of Nigeria
Treaties of Niue
Treaties of Norway
Treaties of Palau
Treaties of Panama
Treaties of Poland
Treaties of Portugal
Treaties of Romania
Treaties of Russia
Treaties of Saint Kitts and Nevis
Treaties of Saint Lucia
Treaties of Saint Vincent and the Grenadines
Treaties of Samoa
Treaties of Serbia
Treaties of Sierra Leone
Treaties of Singapore
Treaties of Slovakia
Treaties of Slovenia
Treaties of Spain
Treaties of Sweden
Treaties of Switzerland
Treaties of Syria
Treaties of Togo
Treaties of Tonga
Treaties of Tunisia
Treaties of Turkey
Treaties of Tuvalu
Treaties of the United Kingdom
Treaties of Vanuatu
Treaties of Vietnam
2001 in the environment
2008 in the environment
Environmental treaties
Environmental impact of shipping
International Maritime Organization treaties
Law of the sea treaties
Liability treaties
Oil spills
Treaties concluded in 2001
Treaties entered into force in 2008
2001 in London
Treaties extended to the Isle of Man
Treaties extended to Gibraltar
Treaties extended to Bermuda
Treaties extended to the Cayman Islands
Treaties extended to the British Virgin Islands
Treaties extended to Macau
Treaties extended to Hong Kong